This is a list of the Japanese species of the superfamilies Pyraloidea, Cimelioidea, Calliduloidae and Drepanoidea. It also acts as an index to the species articles and forms part of the full List of moths of Japan.

Pyralidae
 ハチノスツヅリガ  — Galleria mellonella (Linnaeus, 1758)
 コハチノスツヅリガ  — Achroia grisella (Fabricius, 1794)
 ウスグロツヅリガ  — Achroia innotata obscurevittella Ragonot, 1901
 チャマダラツヅリガ  — Cathayia obliquella Hampson, 1901
 マエグロツヅリガ  — Cataprosopus monstrosus Butler, 1881
 フタスジツヅリガ  — Eulophopalpia pauperalis (Leech, 1889)
 キイロツヅリガ  — Tirathaba irrufatella Ragonot, 1901
 シタキツヅリガ  — Tirathaba mundella Walker, 1864
 オオツヅリガ  — Melissoblaptes zelleri (de Joannis, 1932)
 フタテンツヅリガ  — Aphomia sapozhnikovi (Krulikowski, 1909)
 クロモンツヅリガ  — Doloessa ochrociliella (Ragonot, 1893)
 ミドリツヅリガ  — Doloessa viridis Zeller, 1848
 ウスモンツヅリガ  — Lamoria adaptella (Walker, 1863)
 アカフツヅリガ  — Lamoria glaucalis Caradja, 1925
 ハネナガツヅリガ  — Lamoria infumatella Hampson, 1898
 アワノツヅリガ  — Mampava bipunctella Ragonot, 1888
 ツヅリガ  — Paralipsa gularis (Zeller, 1877)
 オオシマモンツヅリガ  — Thalamorrhyncha cramboides Inoue, 1996
 シマモンツヅリガ  — Thalamorrhyncha isoneura Meyrick, 1933
 ガイマイツヅリガ  — Corcyra cephalonica (Stainton, 1866)
 コメシマメイガ  — Aglossa dimidiata (Haworth, 1810)
 ウスモンマルバシマメイガ  — Hypsopygia kawabei Yamanaka, 1965
 モモイロシマメイガ  — Hypsopygia mauritialis (Boisduval, 1833)
 ウスムラサキシマメイガ  — Hypsopygia postflava (Hampson, 1893)
 トビイロシマメイガ  — Hypsopygia regina (Butler, 1879)
 シロモンシマメイガ  — Pyralis albiguttata Warren, 1891
 カシノシマメイガ  — Pyralis farinalis (Linnaeus, 1758)
 ネッタイシマメイガ  — Pyralis manihotalis Guenée, 1854
 ネグロシマメイガ  — Pyralis pictalis (Curtis, 1834)
 ギンモンシマメイガ  — Pyralis regalis [Denis & Schiffermüller], 1775
 ムラサキシマメイガ  — Scenedra umbrosalis (Wileman, 1911)
 ニセマエモンシマメイガ  — Stemmatophora albifimbrialis (Hampson, 1906)
 トビイロフタスジシマメイガ  — Stemmatophora valida (Butler, 1879)
 ナカアカシマメイガ  — Tamraca torridalis (Lederer, 1863)
 マエモンシマメイガ  — Tegulifera bicoloralis (Leech, 1889)
 チビシマメイガ  — Tegulifera faviusalis (Walker, 1859)
 ヒトスジシマメイガ  — Bostra mirifica Inoue, 1985
 ヒメアカシマメイガ  — Bostra nanalis (Wileman, 1911)
 フタスジシマメイガ  — Orthopygia glaucinalis (Linnaeus, 1758)
 コナフキアカシマメイガ  — Orthopygia igniflualis (Walker, 1859)
 ツマアカシマメイガ  — Orthopygia nannodes (Butler, 1879)
 ツマキシマメイガ  — Orthopygia placens (Butler, 1879)
 クロスジキシマメイガ  — Orthopygia repetita (Butler, 1887)
 アカヘリシマメイガ  — Herculia drabicilialis Yamanaka, 1968
 エゾシマメイガ  — Herculia jezoensis Shibuya, 1928
 オオバシマメイガ  — Herculia orthogramma Inoue, 1960
 アカシマメイガ  — Herculia pelasgalis (Walker, 1859)
 ヤマモトシマメイガ  — Minooa yamamotoi Yamanaka, 1996
 キガシラシマメイガ  — Trebania flavifrontalis (Leech, 1889)
 クシヒゲシマメイガ  — Sybrida approximans (Leech, [1889])
 オオクシヒゲシマメイガ  — Datanoides fasciata Butler, 1878
 ミサキクシヒゲシマメイガ  — Datanoides misakiensis (Shibuya, 1928)
 ツマグロシマメイガ  — Arippara indicator Walker, 1864
 キンボシシマメイガ  — Orybina regalis (Leech, 1889)
 ニシキシマメイガ  — Mimicia pseudolibatrix (Caradja, 1925)
 クンジシマメイガ  — Vitessa pyraliata triangulifera Munroe & Shaffer, 1980
 シロオビトガリメイガ  — Endotricha aculeatalis Inoue, 1982
 ウスオビトガリメイガ  — Endotricha consocia (Butler, 1879)
 シロスジトガリメイガ  — Endotricha costaemaculalis costaemaculalis Christoph, 1881
 キオビトガリメイガ  — Endotricha flavofascialis affinialis South, 1901
 オオウスベニトガリメイガ  — Endotricha icelusalis (Walker, 1859)
 イノウエトガリメイガ  — Endotricha inouei Yoshiyasu, 1987
 キモントガリメイガ  — Endotricha kuznetzovi Whalley, 1963
 キベリトガリメイガ  — Endotricha minialis (Fabricius, 1794)
 ウスベニトガリメイガ  — Endotricha olivacealis (Bremer, 1864)
 キバネトガリメイガ  — Endotricha pulverealis Hampson, 1916
 アカオビトガリメイガ  — Endotricha ruminalis (Walker, 1859)
 カバイロトガリメイガ  — Endotricha theonalis (Walker, 1859)
 ツマグロフトメイガ  — Noctuides melanophia Staudinger, 1892
 ミドリネグロフトメイガ  — Stericta flavopuncta Inoue & Sasaki, 1995
 ネグロフトメイガ  — Stericta kogii Inoue & Sasaki, 1995
 クロバネフトメイガ  — Lepidogma angusta (Inoue, 1988)
 キイフトメイガ  — Lepidogma kiiensis Marumo, 1920
 和名未定  — Lepidogma latifasciata (Wileman, 1911)
 コネアオフトメイガ  — Lepidogma melanobasis Hampson, 1906
 アカオビフトメイガ  — Lepidogma tripartita (Wileman & South, 1917)
 オオフトメイガ  — Salma amica (Butler, 1879)
 オオナカジロフトメイガ  — Teliphasa albifusa (Hampson, 1896)
 ナカアオフトメイガ  — Teliphasa elegans (Butler, 1881)
 サキシマフトメイガ  — Teliphasa sakishimensis Inoue & Yamanaka, 1975
 フタスジフトメイガ  — Termioptycha bilineata (Wileman, 1911)
 マエアカフトメイガ  — Termioptycha eucarta (Felder & Rogenhofer, 1874)
 ソトベニフトメイガ  — Termioptycha inimica (Butler, 1879)
 ナカジロフトメイガ  — Termioptycha margarita (Butler, 1879)
 クロフトメイガ  — Termioptycha nigrescens (Warren, 1891)
 ハスジフトメイガ  — Epilepia dentata (Matsumura & Shibuya, 1927)
 ウスグロフトメイガ  — Lamida obscura (Moore, 1888)
 トサカフトメイガ  — Locastra muscosalis (Walker, 1866)
 ナカムラサキフトメイガ  — Lista ficki (Christoph, 1881)
 ナカトビフトメイガ  — Orthaga achatina achatina (Butler, 1878)
 クロモンフトメイガ  — Orthaga euadrusalis Walker, 1859
 アオフトメイガ  — Orthaga olivacea (Warren, 1891)
 ネアオフトメイガ  — Orthaga onerata (Butler, 1879)
 ミドリフトメイガ  — Trichotophysa jucundalis (Walker, 1866)
 キバネチビマダラメイガ  — Quasipuer colon (Christoph, 1881)
 ツチトリモチマダラメイガ  — Assara balanophorae Sasaki & Tanaka, 2004
 オオマエジロマダラメイガ  — Assara formosana Yoshiyasu, 1991
 マエジロクロマダラメイガ  — Assara funerella (Ragonot, 1901)
 チビマエジロホソマダラメイガ  — Assara hoeneella Roesler, 1965
 イノウエマエジロマダラメイガ  — Assara inouei Yamanaka, 1994
 フタシロテンホソマダラメイガ  — Assara korbi (Caradja, 1910)
 ウスマエジロマダラメイガ  — Assara pallidella Yamanaka, 1994
 シロスジマダラメイガ  — Assara terebrella (Zincken, 1818)
 ウスオビクロマダラメイガ  — Glyptoteles leucacrinella Zeller, 1848
 フタモンマダラメイガ  — Euzophera batangensis Caradja, 1939
 和名未定  — Euzophera diminutella Ragonot, 1901
 ウススジクロマダラメイガ  — Euzophera fumatella Yamanaka, 1993
 マエジロオオマダラメイガ  — Euzophera watanabei Roesler & Inoue, 1980
 ナカキチビマダラメイガ  — Pseudocadra cuprotaeniella (Christoph, 1881)
 和名未定  — Pseudocadra obscurella Roesler, 1965
 シロオビハイイロマダラメイガ  — Euzopherodes nipponensis Yamanaka, 2006
 シロマダラメイガ  — Euzopherodes oberleae Roesler, 1973
 ウスグロマルバスジマダラメイガ  — Didia fuscostriatella Yamanaka, 2006
 マルバスジマダラメイガ  — Didia striatella (Inoue, 1959)
 ウスイロサンカクマダラメイガ  — Nyctegretis lineana (Scopoli, 1786)
 サンカクマダラメイガ  — Nyctegretis triangulella (Hampson, 1901)
 マツムラマダラメイガ  — Homoeosoma matsumurellum Shibuya, 1927
 トビスジマダラメイガ  — Patagoniodes nipponellus (Ragonot, 1901)
 シロホソマダラメイガ  — Phycitodes albatella ussuriella Roesler, 1965
 ヒトスジホソマダラメイガ  — Phycitodes binaevella (Hübner, [1813])
 フトオビホソマダラメイガ  — Phycitodes recurvaria Inoue, 1982
 ハイイロホソマダラメイガ  — Phycitodes rotundisigna Inoue, 1982
 マエジロホソマダラメイガ  — Phycitodes subcretacella (Ragonot, 1901)
 ハングロホソマダラメイガ  — Phycitodes triangulella (Ragonot, 1901)
 ノシメマダラメイガ  — Plodia interpunctella (Hübner, [1813])
 チャマダラメイガ  — Ephestia elutella (Hübner, [1796])
 スジコナマダラメイガ  — Ephestia kuehniella Zeller, 1879
 スジマダラメイガ  — Cadra cautella (Walker, 1863)
 ホシブドウマダラメイガ  — Cadra figulilella (Gregson, 1871)
 ハラウスキマダラメイガ  — Sandrabatis crassiella Ragonot, 1893
 ヒメアカマダラメイガ  — Sciota adelphella (Fischer von Röslerstamm, 1838)
 シロオビクロマダラメイガ  — Sciota cynicella (Christoph, 1881)
 マエチャマダラメイガ  — Sciota furvicostella (Ragonot, 1893)
 ナカアカスジマダラメイガ  — Nephopterix bicolorella Leech, 1889
 ウスグロアカマダラメイガ  — Nephopterix fumella (Eversmann, 1844)
 エチゴマダラメイガ  — Nephopterix immatura Inoue, 1982
 ヤマトマダラメイガ  — Nephopterix intercisella Wileman, 1911
 マエナミマダラメイガ  — Nephopterix maenamii Inoue, 1959
 ミカドマダラメイガ  — Nephopterix mikadella (Ragonot, 1893)
 ムラサキマダラメイガ  — Nephopterix proximalis Walker, 1863
 トミサワマダラメイガ  — Nephopterix tomisawai Yamanaka, 1986
 ウスチャマダラメイガ  — Pempelia formosa (Haworth, 1811)
 ヒトテンクロマダラメイガ  — Pempelia maculata (Staudinger, 1876)
 オオクロモンマダラメイガ  — Pempelia vinacea (Inoue, 1959)
 ウスクロスジマダラメイガ  — Calguia obscuriella (Inoue, 1959)
 ホソバムラサキマダラメイガ  — Calguia rufobrunnealis Yamanaka, 2006
 シモフリマダラメイガ  — Oncocera faecella (Zeller, 1839)
 アカマダラメイガ  — Oncocera semirubella (Scopoli, 1763)
 和名未定  — Citripestis sagittiferella (Moore, 1881)
 フサヒゲマダラメイガ  — Epicrocis hilarella Ragonot, 1888
 ベニモンマダラメイガ  — Epicrocis oegnusalis (Walker, 1859)
 ウスアカスジマダラメイガ  — Apomyelois fasciatella Inoue, 1982
 フタスジクロマダラメイガ  — Apomyelois subcognata (Ragonot, 1887)
 ゴママダラメイガ  — Myelois circumvoluta (Fourcroy, 1785)
 和名未定  — Myelois psendocribtum Kirpichnikova & Yamanaka, 1999
 和名未定  — Myelois taenialis (Wileman, 1911)
 クシヒゲマダラメイガ  — Mussidia pectinicornella (Hampson, 1896)
 カバイロマダラメイガ  — Volobilis chloropterella (Hampson, 1896)
 イナゴマメマダラメイガ  — Ectomyelois ceratoniae (Zeller, 1839)
 ナシマダラメイガ  — Ectomyelois pyrivorella (Matsumura, 1899)
 ウスジロフタスジマダラメイガ  — Faveria bilineatella (Inoue, 1959)
 テンクロトビマダラメイガ  — Faveria bitinctella (Wileman, 1911)
 コシタジロクロマダラメイガ  — Faveria leucophaeella (Zeller, 1867)
 コチンダマダラメイガ  — Faveria subdasyptera Yamanaka, 2002
 シタジロクロマダラメイガ  — Ptyobathra atrisquamella (Hampson, 1901)
 フタスジアカマダラメイガ  — Boeswarthia oberleella Roesler, 1975
 ウスキマダラメイガ  — Asclerobia gilvaria Yamanaka, 2006
 アカオビマダラメイガ  — Acrobasis bifidella (Leech, 1889)
 ヒメアカオビマダラメイガ  — Acrobasis birgitella (Roesler, 1975)
 ナシツヅリマダラメイガ  — Acrobasis canella Yamanaka, 2003
 エノキアカオビマダラメイガ  — Acrobasis celtifoliella Yamanaka, 2004
 エゾアカオビマダラメイガ  — Acrobasis curvella (Ragonot, 1893)
 ヒメツツマダラメイガ  — Acrobasis cymindella (Ragonot, 1893)
 ウスアカマダラメイガ  — Acrobasis encaustella Ragonot, 1893
 ウスキオビマダラメイガ  — Acrobasis flavifasciella Yamanaka, 1990
 オオアカオビマダラメイガ  — Acrobasis frankella (Roesler, 1975)
 ウスグロアカオビマダラメイガ  — Acrobasis fuscatella Yamanaka, 2004
 ギンマダラメイガ  — Acrobasis heringii (Ragonot, 1888)
 シロオビマダラメイガ  — Acrobasis injunctella (Christoph, 1881)
 ウスモンアカオビマダラメイガ  — Acrobasis izuensis Yamanaka, 2004
 オオウスアカオビマダラメイガ  — Acrobasis lutulentella Yamanaka, 2003
 リンゴハマキマダラメイガ  — Acrobasis malifoliella Yamanaka, 2003
 オオトビネマダラメイガ  — Acrobasis obrutella (Christoph, 1881)
 ニセウスキオビマダラメイガ  — Acrobasis ochrifasciella Yamanaka, 2006
 ヒメトビネマダラメイガ  — Acrobasis rufilimbalis (Wileman, 1911)
 ホソアカオビマダラメイガ  — Acrobasis rufizonella (Ragonot, 1887)
 オオナシツヅリマダラメイガ  — Acrobasis sasakii Yamanaka, 2003
 和名未定  — Acrobasis scabrilineella Ragonot, 1893
 ツツマダラメイガ  — Acrobasis squalidella (Christoph, 1881)
 ヒメエノキアカオビマダラメイガ  — Acrobasis subceltifoliella Yamanaka, 2006
 ナシモンクロマダラメイガ  — Conobathra bellulella (Ragonot, 1893)
 アカフマダラメイガ  — Conobathra ferruginella (Wileman, 1911)
 和名未定  — Conobathra rufofusella (Caradja, 1931)
 ウスアカオビマダラメイガ  — Conobathra subflavella Inoue, 1982
 コクロモンマダラメイガ  — Aurana vinaceella vinaceella (Inoue, 1963)
 フタグロマダラメイガ  — Trachycera dichromella (Ragonot, 1893)
 トビネマダラメイガ  — Trachycera hollandella (Ragonot, 1893)
 ヤマトフタグロマダラメイガ  — Trachycera nipponella Yamanaka, 2000
 オオフタグロマダラメイガ  — Trachycera paradichromella (Yamanaka, 1980)
 コフタグロマダラメイガ  — Trachycera pseudodichromella (Yamanaka, 1980)
 ニセフタグロマダラメイガ  — Trachycera vicinella Yamanaka, 2000
 ヤクシマフタグロマダラメイガ  — Trachycera yakushimensis Yamanaka, 2000
 ギンスジマダラメイガ  — Selagia argyrella ([Denis & Schiffermüller], 1775)
 フタクロテンマダラメイガ  — Selagia spadicella (Hübner, [1796])
 トビマダラメイガ  — Samaria ardentella Ragonot, 1893
 マツノマダラメイガ  — Dioryctria abietella ([Denis & Schiffermüller], 1775)
 ビャクシンマダラメイガ  — Dioryctria juniperella Yamanaka, 1990
 ドイツトウヒマダラメイガ  — Dioryctria okui Mutuura, 1958
 マツアカマダラメイガ  — Dioryctria pryeri Ragonot, 1893
 マツノシンマダラメイガ  — Dioryctria sylvestrella (Ratzeburg, 1840)
 和名未定  — Phycitopsis hemileucella Hampson, 1901
 マエジロギンマダラメイガ  — Pseudacrobasis nankingella Roesler, 1975
 クスノチビマダラメイガ  — Indomalayia flabellifera (Hampson, 1896)
 ヒゲブトマダラメイガ  — Spatulipalpia albistrialis Hampson, 1912
 ウスモンマダラメイガ  — Metriostola atratella Yamanaka, 1986
 イイジマクロマダラメイガ  — Metriostola betulae (Goeze, 1778)
 シロスジクロマダラメイガ  — Metriostola infausta (Ragonot, 1893)
 ウスグロマダラメイガ  — Pyla fusca (Haworth, 1811)
 アカグロマダラメイガ  — Pyla manifestella Inoue, 1982
 ハイイロマダラメイガ  — Sacculocornutia monotonella (Caradja, 1927)
 クチキハイイロマダラメイガ  — Salebriopsis albicilla (Herrich-Schäffer, 1849)
 ネッタイマダラメイガ  — Cryptoblabes gnidiella (Millière, 1867)
 カラマツマダラメイガ  — Cryptoblabes loxiella Ragonot, 1887
 マエウスジロマダラメイガ  — Dipha aphidivora (Meyrick, 1934)
 マエジロマダラメイガ  — Edulicodes inoueella Roesler, 1972
 ハイイロシロスジマダラメイガ  — Psorosa decolorella Yamanaka, 1986
 モモノハマキマダラメイガ  — Psorosa taishanella Roesler, 1975
 和名未定  — Ceroprepes naga Roesler & Kuppers, 1979
 スジグロマダラメイガ  — Ceroprepes nigrolineatella Shibuya, 1927
 ウスアカモンクロマダラメイガ  — Ceroprepes ophthalmicella (Christoph, 1881)
 ウスアカネマダラメイガ  — Ceroprepes patriciella Zeller, 1867
 ヒメイチモジマダラメイガ  — Etiella behrii (Zeller, 1848)
 ミナミイチモジマダラメイガ  — Etiella grisea grisea Hampson, 1903
 キオビマダラメイガ  — Etiella walsinghamella Ragonot, 1888
 シロイチモンジマダラメイガ  — Etiella zinckenella (Treitschke, 1832)
 ネアカマダラメイガ  — Etielloides bipartitella (Leech, 1889)
 ナシハマキマダラメイガ  — Etielloides curvella Shibuya, 1928
 コギマダラメイガ  — Etielloides kogii Yamanaka, 1998
 ニセナシハマキマダラメイガ  — Etielloides sejunctella (Christoph, 1881)
 マルモンマダラメイガ  — Protoetiella bipunctella Inoue, 1959
 アカウスグロマダラメイガ  — Neorufalda pullella Yamanaka, 1986
 シロチビマダラメイガ  — Eucampyla estriatella Yamanaka, 1986
 サビイロマダラメイガ  — Microthrix inconspicuella (Ragonot, 1888)
 アカモンマダラメイガ  — Myelopsis rufimaculella Yamanaka, 1993
 ウスアカムラサキマダラメイガ  — Addyme confusalis Yamanaka, 2006
 ウストビマダラメイガ  — Pseudosyria dilutella (Hübner, [1796])
 クロオビマダラメイガ  — Hoeneodes vittatellus (Ragonot, 1887)
 和名未定  — Elasmopalpus bipaltiellus (Leech)
 シロフタスジマダラメイガ  — Indomyrlaea eugraphella (Ragonot, 1888)
 ウストビネマダラメイガ  — Thiallela hiranoi Yamanaka, 2002
 ウラギンマダラメイガ  — Hypargyria metalliferella Ragonot, 1888
 ハマベホソメイガ  — Anerastia lotella (Hübner, [1813])
 スジホソメイガ  — Osakia lineolella Ragonot, 1901
 ヒトホシホソメイガ  — Hypsotropa solipunctella Ragonot, 1901
 和名未定  — Raphimetopus ablutellus (Zeller, 1839)
 ヒエホソメイガ  — Enosima leucotaeniella (Ragonot, 1888)
 ウスベニホソメイガ  — Critonia roseistrigella Hampson, 1896
 和名未定  — Polyocha diversella Hampson, 1899
 オオマエジロホソメイガ  — Emmalocera gensanalis South, 1901
 マエジロホソメイガ  — Emmalocera venosella (Wileman, 1911)
 ニシザワマダラメイガ  — Cathyalia nishizawai Yamanaka, 2004
 ナキジンマダラメイガ  — Cathyalia okinawana Yamanaka, 2003
 ハリツルマサキマダラメイガ  — Bahiria maytenella Yamanaka, 2004
 シベチャマダラメイガ  — Copamyntis martimella Kirpichnikova & Yamanaka, 2002

Crambidae
 タンザワヤマメイガ  — Scoparia depressoides Inoue, 1994
 ホソバヤマメイガ  — Scoparia isochroalis Hampson, 1907
 イワサキヤマメイガ  — Scoparia iwasakii Sasaki, 1991
 マダラヤマメイガ  — Scoparia latipennis Sasaki, 1991
 マツイヤマメイガ  — Scoparia matsuii Inoue, 1994
 オオクロモンヤマメイガ  — Scoparia molestalis Inoue, 1982
 オオヤマメイガ  — Scoparia nipponalis Inoue, 1982
 ノリクラヤマメイガ  — Scoparia spinata Inoue, 1982
 ウスモンヤマメイガ  — Scoparia submolestalis Inoue, 1982
 トウホクヤマメイガ  — Scoparia tohokuensis Inoue, 1982
 ウツギヤマメイガ  — Scoparia utsugii Inoue, 1994
 ヤクシマクロヤマメイガ  — Scoparia yakushimana Inoue, 1982
 ヤマナカヤマメイガ  — Scoparia yamanakai Inoue, 1982
 アルプスヤマメイガ  — Eudonia alpina (Curtis, 1850)
 スジブトヤマメイガ  — Eudonia magnibursa Inoue, 1982
 スジボソヤマメイガ  — Eudonia microdontalis (Hampson, 1907)
 タカネヤマメイガ  — Eudonia nakajimai Sasaki, 2002
 ウスグロヤマメイガ  — Eudonia persimilis Sasaki, 1991
 マルモンヤマメイガ  — Eudonia puellaris Sasaki, 1991
 ヒラノヤマメイガ  — Eudonia truncicolella (Stainton, 1849)
 カラフトヤマメイガ  — Gesneria centuriella ([Denis & Schiffermüller], 1775)
 キンバネヤマメイガ  — Micraglossa aureata Inoue, 1982
 シロエグリツトガ  — Glaucocharis exsectella (Christoph, 1881)
 ハイイロエグリツトガ  — Glaucocharis moriokensis (Okano, 1962)
 クロエグリツトガ  — Glaucocharis mutuurella (Bleszynski, 1965)
 ヒメシロエグリツトガ  — Glaucocharis parviexectella Sasaki, 2007
 オキナワエグリツトガ  — Glaucocharis unipunctalis Sasaki, 2007
 ウスイロエグリツトガ  — Glaucocharis utsugii Sasaki, 2007
 ミヤマエグリツトガ  — Glaucocharis vermeeri (Bleszynski, 1965)
 イリオモテエグリツトガ  — Mesolia bipunctella Wileman & South, 1918
 キオビカナサンツトガ  — Metaeuchromius flavofascialis Park, 1990
 カナサンツトガ  — Metaeuchromius kimurai Sasaki, 2005
 ソトモンツトガ  — Miyakea expansa (Butler, 1881)
 モンチビツトガ  — Microchilo inexpectellus Bleszynski, 1965
 チビツトガ  — Microchilo inouei Okano, 1962
 ホソスジツトガ  — Pseudargyria interruptella (Walker, 1866)
 オオバツトガ  — Chilo christophi Bleszynski, 1965
 ナイトウツトガ  — Chilo infuscatellus Snellen, 1890
 ヨシツトガ  — Chilo luteellus (Motschulsky, 1866)
 ニカメイガモドキ  — Chilo niponella (Thunberg, 1788)
 カバイロツトガ  — Chilo phragmitellus (Hübner, [1805])
 ゴマフツトガ  — Chilo pulveratus (Wileman & South, 1917)
 スジツトガ  — Chilo sacchariphagus stramineellus (Caradja, 1926)
 ニカメイガ  — Chilo suppressalis (Walker, 1863)
 チャバネツトガ  — Japonichilo bleszynskii Okano, 1962
 ウスチャツトガ  — Pseudocatharylla duplicella (Hampson, 1895)
 シロミャクツトガ  — Pseudocatharylla inclaralis (Walker, 1863)
 マエジロツトガ  — Pseudocatharylla infixella (Walker, 1863)
 マエキツトガ  — Pseudocatharylla simplex (Zeller, 1877)
 ヒトテンツトガ  — Calamotropha albistrigellus Hampson, 1898
 フタキスジツトガ  — Calamotropha aureliella fulvilineata Okano, 1958
 ヒメキスジツトガ伊豆諸島以外亜種  — Calamotropha brevistrigella brevistrigella (Caradja, 1932)
 ヒメキスジツトガ伊豆諸島亜種  — Calamotropha brevistrigella maenamii Inoue, 1982
 ツチイロツトガ  — Calamotropha doii Sasaki, 1997
 サキシマツトガ  — Calamotropha formosella Bleszynski, 1961
 ヒメキテンシロツトガ  — Calamotropha fulvifusalis (Hampson, 1900)
 キスジツトガ  — Calamotropha nigripunctella (Leech, 1889)
 サツマツトガ  — Calamotropha okanoi Bleszynski, 1961
 シロツトガ  — Calamotropha paludella purella (Leech, 1889)
 イツトガ  — Calamotropha shichito (Marumo, 1931)
 フタオレツトガ八重山亜種  — Calamotropha yamanakai owadai Inoue, 1982
 フタオレツトガ屋久島以北亜種  — Calamotropha yamanakai yamanakai Inoue, 1958
 クロマダラツトガ  — Chrysoteuchia atrosignata (Zeller, 1877)
 ツマスジツトガ  — Chrysoteuchia culmella ussuriella (Bleszynski, 1962)
 ダイセツツトガ  — Chrysoteuchia daisetsuzana (Matsumura, 1927)
 ウスクロスジツトガ  — Chrysoteuchia diplogramma (Zeller, 1863)
 テンスジツトガ  — Chrysoteuchia distinctella (Leech, 1889)
 和名未定  — Chrysoteuchia gregorella Bleszynski, 1965
 モリオカツトガ  — Chrysoteuchia moriokensis (Okano, 1958)
 ナカモンツトガ  — Chrysoteuchia porcelanella (Motschulsky, 1861)
 ウスキバネツトガ  — Chrysoteuchia pseudodiplogramma (Okano, 1962)
 ハラキクロツトガ  — Chrysoteuchia pyraustoides (Erschoff, 1877)
 和名未定  — Crambus alexandrus Kirpichnikova, 1979
 シロスジツトガ  — Crambus argyrophorus Butler, 1878
 オガサワラツトガ  — Crambus boninellus Shibuya, 1929
 ミヤマウスギンツトガ  — Crambus hachimantaiensis Okano, 1957
 エダツトガ  — Crambus hamellus (Thunberg, 1788)
 ギンスジツトガ  — Crambus humidellus Zeller, 1877
 フトシロスジツトガ  — Crambus kuzakaiensis Okano, 1960
 オキナワツトガ  — Crambus okinawanus Inoue, 1982
 ギントガリツトガ  — Crambus pascuellus (Linnaeus, 1758)
 ウスギンツトガ  — Crambus perlellus (Scopoli, 1763)
 ニセシロスジツトガ  — Crambus pseudargyrophorus Okano, 1960
 ホソエダツトガ  — Crambus sibiricus Alphéraky, 1897
 ヒメギンスジツトガ  — Crambus silvellus (Hübner, [1813])
 ツシマツトガ  — Crambus sinicolellus Caradja, 1926
 サロベツツトガ  — Crambus uliginosellus Zeller, 1850
 ナカグロツトガ  — Crambus virgatellus Wileman, 1911
 シロフタスジツトガ  — Agriphila aeneociliella (Eversmann, 1844)
 コギツトガ  — Agriphila sakayehamanus (Matsumura, 1925)
 ヒメフタテンツトガ  — Catoptria amathusia Bleszynski, 1965
 エゾシロモンツトガ  — Catoptria aurora Bleszynski, 1965
 タカネツトガ  — Catoptria harutai Okano, 1958
 和名未定  — Catoptria inouella Bleszynski, 1965
 フタテンツトガ  — Catoptria montivaga (Inoue, 1955)
 オオヒシモンツトガ  — Catoptria munroeella Bleszynski, 1965
 シロモンツトガ  — Catoptria nana Okano, 1959
 ヒシモンツトガ  — Catoptria permiaca (Petersen, 1834)
 ナカオビチビツトガ  — Catoptria persephone Bleszynski, 1965
 キタヒシモンツトガ  — Catoptria pinella (Linnaeus, 1758)
 ダイセツチビツトガ  — Catoptria satakei (Okano, 1962)
 ニセフタテンツトガ  — Catoptria submontivaga Bleszynski, 1965
 シラユキツトガ  — Catoptria viridiana Bleszynski, 1965
 クロスジツトガ  — Flavocrambus striatellus (Leech, 1889)
 フタスジミヤマツトガ  — Japonicrambus bilineatus (Okano, 1957)
 オオフタスジミヤマツトガ  — Japonicrambus ishizukai Okano, 1962
 ヤツガダケミヤマツトガ  — Japonicrambus mitsundoi Sasaki & Jinbo, 2002
 ウスグロツトガ  — Xanthocrambus lucellus (Herrich-Schäffer, [1848])
 クロフタオビツトガ  — Neopediasia mixtalis (Walker, 1863)
 シバツトガ  — Parapediasia teterella (Zincken, 1821)
 ナガハマツトガ  — Platytes ornatella (Leech, 1889)
 ツトガ  — Ancylolomia japonica Zeller, 1877
 リュウキュウツトガ  — Ancylolomia westwoodi bitubirosella Amsel, 1959
 シロオビチビツトガ  — Roxita albipennata Inoue, 1989
 キンイロエグリツトガ  — Roxita fujianella Sung & Chen, 2002
 クドウツトガ  — Pseudobissetia terrestrella kudoi Inoue, 1990
 シロチビツトガ  — Gargela xanthocasis (Meyrick, 1897)
 ウスフタスジシロオオメイガ  — Leechia bilinealis South, 1901
 フタスジシロオオメイガ  — Leechia sinuosalis South, 1901
 キボシオオメイガ  — Patissa fulvosparsa (Butler, 1881)
 ヒメキボシオオメイガ  — Patissa minima Inoue, 1995
 シロオオメイガ  — Scirpophaga excerptalis (Walker, 1863)
 ウスキシロオオメイガ  — Scirpophaga gotoi Lewvanich, 1981
 イッテンオオメイガ  — Scirpophaga incertulas (Walker, 1863)
 ヒトスジオオメイガ  — Scirpophaga lineata (Butler, 1879)
 チビウスキオオメイガ  — Scirpophaga micraurea Sasaki, 1994
 ツマキオオメイガ  — Scirpophaga nivella (Fabricius, 1794)
 マエウスグロオオメイガ  — Scirpophaga parvalis (Wileman, 1911)
 ムモンシロオオメイガ  — Scirpophaga praelata (Scopoli, 1763)
 コガタシロオオメイガ  — Scirpophaga virginia Schultze, 1908
 ニセムモンシロオオメイガ  — Scirpophaga xanthopygata Schawerda, 1922
 クロフキオオメイガ  — Schoenobius sasakii Inoue, 1982
 フタテンオオメイガ  — Catagela subdodatella Inoue, 1982
 トガリオオメイガ  — Donacaula mucronella ([Denis & Schiffermüller], 1775)
 ウスアカモンノメイガ  — Hendecasis minutalis Hampson, 1906
 アカモンヒゲナガノメイガ  — Hendecasis pulchella (Hampson, 1916)
 フタオビノメイガ  — Trichophysetis cretacea (Butler, 1879)
 トビモンシロノメイガ  — Trichophysetis rufoterminalis (Christoph, 1881)
 ウスキモンメイガ  — Ptychopseustis pallidochrealis Yamanaka, 2004
 ウスキミズメイガ  — Musotima colonalis (Bremer, 1864)
 エグリミズメイガ  — Musotima dryopterisivora Yoshiyasu, 1985
 クマタミズメイガ  — Musotima kumatai Inoue, 1996
 タンザワミズメイガ  — Musotima tanzawensis Yoshiyasu, 1985
 カニクサシダメイガ  — Neomusotima fuscolinealis Yoshiyasu, 1985
 和名未定  — Melanochroa yasudai Yoshiyasu, 1985
 ネジロミズメイガ  — Elophila fengwhanalis (Pryer, 1877)
 マダラミズメイガ  — Elophila interruptalis (Pryer, 1877)
 和名未定  — Elophila melagynalis (Agassiz, 1978)
 クロスジマダラミズメイガ  — Elophila miurai Yoshiyasu, 1985
 ソトキマダラミズメイガ  — Elophila nigralbalis (Caradja, 1925)
 ニセマダラミズメイガ  — Elophila nigrolinealis (Pryer, 1877)
 和名未定  — Elophila nymphaeata (Linnaeus, 1758)
 ウスマダラミズメイガ  — Elophila orientalis (Filipjev, 1934)
 シナミズメイガ  — Elophila sinicalis (Hampson, 1897)
 ヒメマダラミズメイガ  — Elophila turbata (Butler, 1881)
 ギンモンミズメイガ  — Nymphula corculina (Butler, 1879)
 ソトシロスジミズメイガ  — Nymphula distinctalis (Ragonot, 1894)
 ミドロミズメイガ  — Neoschoenobia testacealis Hampson, 1900
 ヤエヤマミズメイガ  — Parapoynx bilinealis (Snellen, 1876)
 タカムクミズメイガ  — Parapoynx crisonalis (Walker, 1859)
 クロテンシロミズメイガ  — Parapoynx diminutalis Snellen, 1880
 イネミズメイガ  — Parapoynx fluctuosalis (Zeller, 1852)
 ミサキコミズメイガ  — Parapoynx moriutii Yoshiyasu, 2005
 ヒメコミズメイガ  — Parapoynx rectilinealis Yoshiyasu, 1985
 シロミズメイガ  — Parapoynx stagnalis (Zeller, 1852)
 ムナカタミズメイガ  — Parapoynx ussuriensis (Rebel, 1910)
 イネコミズメイガ  — Parapoynx vittalis (Bremer, 1864)
 スジグロミズメイガ  — Paracymoriza fuscalis (Yoshiyasu, 1985)
 クロバミズメイガ  — Paracymoriza nigra (Warren, 1896)
 オキナワミズメイガ  — Paracymoriza okinawanus (Yoshiyasu & Arita, 1992)
 ゼニガサミズメイガ  — Paracymoriza prodigalis (Leech, 1897)
 カワゴケミズメイガ  — Paracymoriza vagalis (Walker, [1866])
 和名未定  — Potamomusa aquilonia Yoshiyasu, 1985
 キオビミズメイガ  — Potamomusa midas (Butler, 1881)
 タイワンヨツクロモンミズメイガ  — Eoophyla conjunctalis (Wileman & South, 1917)
 ヨツクロモンミズメイガ  — Eoophyla inouei Yoshiyasu, 1979
 モトシロアトモンミズメイガ  — Nymphicula albibasalis Yoshiyasu, 1980
 コアトモンミズメイガ  — Nymphicula mesorphna (Meyrick, 1894)
 アトモンミズメイガ  — Nymphicula saigusai Yoshiyasu, 1980
 アマミアトモンミズメイガ  — Nymphicula yoshiyasui Agassiz, 2002
 クロアトモンミズメイガ  — Paracataclysta fuscalis (Hampson, 1893)
 エンスイミズメイガ  — Eristena argentata Yoshiyasu, 1988
 シロスジクルマメイガ  — Atralata albofascialis (Treitschke, 1829)
 ウスムラサキクルマメイガ  — Clupeosoma cinereum (Warren, 1892)
 ナカアカクルマメイガ  — Clupeosoma pryeri (Butler, 1881)
 ムラサキクルマメイガ  — Clupeosoma purpureum Inoue, 1982
 ウスイロニセノメイガ  — Evergestis aenealis ([Denis & Schiffermüller], 1775)
 ウスベニニセノメイガ  — Evergestis extimalis (Scopoli, 1763)
 ナニセノメイガ  — Evergestis forficalis (Linnaeus, 1758)
 ヘリジロカラスニセノメイガ  — Evergestis holophaealis (Hampson, 1913)
 フタモンキニセノメイガ本州以南亜種  — Evergestis junctalis conjunctalis Inoue, 1955
 フタモンキニセノメイガ北海道亜種  — Evergestis junctalis junctalis (Warren, 1892)
 ケブカノメイガ  — Crocidolomia pavonana (Fabricius, 1794)
 ハイマダラノメイガ  — Hellula undalis (Fabricius, 1781)
 モンキシロノメイガ  — Cirrhochrista brizoalis (Walker, 1859)
 コウセンポシロノメイガ  — Cirrhochrista kosemponialis Strand, 1919
 ハイモンシロノメイガ  — Pachybotys spissalis (Guenée, 1854)
 クロスカシトガリノメイガ  — Cotachena alysoni Whalley, 1961
 チャイロスカシトガリノメイガ  — Cotachena brunnealis Yamanaka, 2001
 スカシトガリノメイガ  — Cotachena pubescens (Warren, 1892)
 タイワンスカシトガリノメイガ  — Cotachena taiwanalis Yamanaka, 2001
 モンキノメイガ  — Pelena sericea (Butler, 1879)
 オガサワラハラナガノメイガ  — Tatobotys albivenalis Hampson, 1898
 キオビハラナガノメイガ  — Tatobotys aurantialis Hampson, 1897
 キバネハラナガノメイガ  — Tatobotys biannulalis (Walker, 1866)
 ウスグロハラナガノメイガ  — Tatobotys janapalis (Walker, 1859)
 シロテンノメイガ  — Diathrausta brevifascialis (Wileman, 1911)
 ヒメシロテンノメイガ  — Diathrausta profundalis Lederer, 1863
 マエシロモンノメイガ  — Diathraustodes amoenialis (Christoph, 1881)
 クビシロノメイガ  — Piletocera aegimiusalis (Walker, 1859)
 コガタシロモンノメイガ  — Piletocera sodalis (Leech, 1889)
 ハナダカノメイガ  — Camptomastix hisbonalis (Walker, 1859)
 ヒメハナダカノメイガ  — Camptomastix septentrionalis Inoue, 1982
 シロオビナカボカシノメイガ  — Cangetta rectilinea Moore, 1886
 マエクロモンシロノメイガ  — Neohendecasis apiciferalis (Walker, 1866)
 エグリノメイガ  — Diplopseustis perieresalis (Walker, 1859)
 クロエグリノメイガ  — Sufetula minuscula Inoue, 1996
 シロスジエグリノメイガ  — Sufetula sunidesalis Walker, 1859
 ミツテンノメイガ  — Mabra charonialis (Walker, 1859)
 ナカグロチビノメイガ  — Mabra eryxalis (Walker, 1859)
 ヒメミツテンノメイガ  — Mabra nigriscripta Swinhoe, 1895
 マエモンノメイガ  — Aripana cribrata (Fabricius, 1794)
 ゴマダラノメイガ  — Pycnarmon lactiferalis (Walker, 1859)
 ヒメゴマダラノメイガ  — Pycnarmon meritalis (Walker, 1859)
 クロオビノメイガ  — Pycnarmon pantherata (Butler, 1878)
 クロクモキノメイガ  — Tylostega tylostegalis (Hampson, 1900)
 シロオビノメイガ  — Spoladea recurvalis (Fabricius, 1775)
 フタシロオビノメイガ  — Hymenia persectalis (Hübner, [1796])
 アヤナミノメイガ  — Eurrhyparodes accessalis (Walker, 1859)
 オオアヤナミノメイガ  — Eurrhyparodes tricoloralis (Zeller, 1852)
 クロモンハイイロノメイガ  — Charitoprepes lubricosa Warren, 1896
 オオムラサキノメイガ  — Agrotera basinotata Hampson, 1891
 モトキムラサキノメイガ  — Agrotera flavobasalis Hampson, 1996
 ウスムラサキノメイガ  — Agrotera nemoralis (Scopoli, 1763)
 クロウスムラサキノメイガ  — Agrotera posticalis Wileman, 1911
 フタマタノメイガ  — Pagyda arbiter (Butler, 1879)
 キハダクロオビノメイガ  — Pagyda citrinella Inoue, 1996
 ヨスジノメイガ  — Pagyda quadrilineata Butler, 1881
 マタスジノメイガ  — Pagyda quinquelineata Hering, 1903
 キンスジノメイガ  — Daulia afralis Walker, 1859
 ムツテンノメイガ  — Talanga nympha (Butler, 1880)
 ヨツボシノメイガ  — Talanga quadrimaculalis (Bremer & Grey, 1853)
 ナカオビノメイガ  — Hydriris ornatalis (Duponchel, 1832)
 Cnaphalocrocis daisensis (Shibuya, 1929)
 イネハカジノメイガ  — Cnaphalocrocis exigua (Butler, 1879)
 コブノメイガ  — Cnaphalocrocis medinalis (Guenée, 1854)
 ハネナガコブノメイガ  — Cnaphalocrocis pilosa (Warren, 1896)
 チビコブノメイガ  — Cnaphalocrocis poeyalis (Boisduval, 1833)
 ハカジモドキノメイガ  — Cnaphalocrocis stereogona (Meyrick, 1886)
 コブナシノメイガ  — Cnaphalocrocis suspicalis (Walker, 1859)
 マエキモンクロノメイガ  — Syngamia falsidicalis (Walker, 1859)
 キンモンノメイガ  — Aethaloessa calidalis tiphalis (Walker, 1859)
 オガサワラシロモンクロノメイガ  — Bocchoris albipunctalis Shibuya, 1929
 シロモンノメイガ  — Bocchoris inspersalis (Zeller, 1852)
 マエトビノメイガ  — Ategumia adipalis (Lederer, 1863)
 ヤブカラシノメイガ  — Sameodes abstrusalis (Moore, 1888)
 ナカキノメイガ  — Sameodes aptalis usitatus (Butler, 1879)
 アミモントガリノメイガ  — Sameodes cancellalis (Zeller, 1852)
 コシロモンノメイガ  — Chabula acamasalis (Walker, 1859)
 オオシロモンノメイガ  — Chabula telphusalis (Walker, 1859)
 アミメトガリノメイガ  — Chabula trivitralis (Swinhoe, 1895)
 ソトグロキノメイガ  — Analthes euryterminalis (Hampson, 1918)
 キボシノメイガ  — Analthes insignis (Butler, 1881)
 ハラナガキマダラノメイガ  — Analthes maculalis (Leech, 1889)
 シロヒトモンノメイガ  — Analthes semitritalis orbicularis (Shibuya, 1928)
 ヒメクロスジノメイガ  — Tyspanodes gracilis Inoue, 1982
 クロスジノメイガ  — Tyspanodes striatus striatus (Butler, 1879)
 ハグルマノメイガ  — Nevrina procopia (Stoll, 1781)
 コモンゴマダラノメイガ  — Conogethes parvipunctalis Inoue & Yamanaka, 2006
 マツノゴマダラノメイガ  — Conogethes pinicolalis Inoue & Yamanaka, 2006
 モモノゴマダラノメイガ  — Conogethes punctiferalis (Guenée, 1854)
 カクモンノメイガ  — Rehimena surusalis (Walker, 1854)
 キバネカクモンノメイガ  — Rehimena variegata Inoue, 1996
 ハイイロノメイガ  — Metasia bilineatella Inoue, 1996
 カクモンミスジノメイガ  — Nacoleia charesalis (Walker, 1859)
 シロテンキノメイガ  — Nacoleia commixta (Butler, 1879)
 和名未定  — Nacoleia fumidalis (Leech, 1889)
 コガタノメイガ  — Nacoleia gressitti Inoue, 1996
 イノウエノメイガ  — Nacoleia inouei Yamanaka, 1980
 サツマキノメイガ  — Nacoleia satsumalis South, 1901
 クロフキノメイガ  — Nacoleia sibirialis (Millière, 1879)
 ネモンノメイガ  — Nacoleia tampiusalis (Walker, 1859)
 シロモンコノメイガ  — Glycythyma chrysorycta (Meyrick, 1884)
 クロミスジシロノメイガ  — Metoeca foedalis (Guenée, 1854)
 ハイイロホソバノメイガ  — Dolicharthria bruguieralis (Duponchel, 1833)
 オキナワミスジノメイガ  — Omiodes decisalis (Walker, [1866])
 キオビノメイガ  — Omiodes diemenalis (Guenée, 1854)
 マエウスキノメイガ  — Omiodes indicatus (Fabricius, 1775)
 トガリシロアシクロノメイガ  — Omiodes indistinctus (Warren, 1892)
 ヒメクロミスジノメイガ  — Omiodes miserus (Butler, 1879)
 ヤマトシロアシクロノメイガ  — Omiodes nipponalis Yamanaka, 2005
 キバラノメイガ  — Omiodes noctescens (Moore, 1888)
 クロミスジノメイガ  — Omiodes similis (Moore, [1885])
 シロアシクロノメイガ  — Omiodes tristrialis (Bremer, 1864)
 ナカキトガリノメイガ  — Preneopogon catenalis (Wileman, 1911)
 クロヘリキノメイガ  — Goniorhynchus butyrosus (Butler, 1879)
 トビヘリキノメイガ  — Goniorhynchus clausalis (Christoph, 1881)
 クロズノメイガ  — Goniorhynchus exemplaris Hampson, 1898
 シャクトリノメイガ  — Ceratarcha umbrosa Swinhoe, 1894
 ウスカバイロノメイガ  — Endocrossis caldusalis (Walker, 1859)
 アカヘリオオキノメイガ  — Botyodes asialis Guenée, 1854
 タイワンウスキノメイガ  — Botyodes diniasalis (Walker, 1859)
 オオキノメイガ  — Botyodes principalis Leech, 1889
 クロスジキンノメイガ  — Pleuroptya balteata (Fabricius, 1798)
 ヒメウコンノメイガ  — Pleuroptya brevipennis Inoue, 1982
 ハングロキノメイガ  — Pleuroptya characteristica (Warren, 1896)
 ホソミスジノメイガ  — Pleuroptya chlorophanta (Butler, 1878)
 シロハラノメイガ  — Pleuroptya deficiens (Moore, 1887)
 ウスキモンノメイガ  — Pleuroptya expictalis (Christoph, 1881)
 オオキバラノメイガ  — Pleuroptya harutai (Inoue, 1955)
 コヨツメノメイガ  — Pleuroptya inferior (Hampson, 1898)
 アマミキノメイガ  — Pleuroptya iopasalis (Walker, 1859)
 ウスバキンノメイガ  — Pleuroptya plagiatalis (Walker, 1859)
 ウスイロキンノメイガ  — Pleuroptya punctimarginalis (Hampson, 1896)
 ヨツメノメイガ  — Pleuroptya quadrimaculalis (Kollar, [1844])
 ウコンノメイガ  — Pleuroptya ruralis (Scopoli, 1763)
 ミナミウコンノメイガ  — Pleuroptya sabinusalis (Walker, 1859)
 ソトグロオオキノメイガ  — Pleuroptya scinisalis (Walker, 1859)
 ウグイスノメイガ  — Pleuroptya ultimalis (Walker, 1859)
 ワタヌキノメイガ  — Haritalodes basipunctalis (Bremer, 1864)
 ワタノメイガ  — Haritalodes derogata (Fabricius, 1775)
 和名未定  — Syllepte cissalis Yamanaka, 1987
 オオツチイロノメイガ  — Syllepte fuscoinvalidalis (Yamanaka, 1959)
 クロヘリノメイガ  — Syllepte fuscomarginalis (Leech, 1889)
 ツチイロノメイガ  — Syllepte invalidalis South, 1901
 ホソオビツチイロノメイガ  — Syllepte pallidinotalis (Hampson, 1912)
 モンシロクロノメイガ  — Syllepte segnalis (Leech, 1889)
 タイワンモンキノメイガ  — Syllepte taiwanalis Shibuya, 1928
 コハングロキノメイガ  — Syllepte verecunda (Warren, 1896)
 ウスグロヨツモンノメイガ  — Lygropia yerburii nipponica Inoue, 1986
 ベニモンノメイガ  — Agathodes ostentalis (Geyer, 1837)
 ウスモンヒメシロノメイガ  — Palpita homalia Inoue, 1996
 ヒメシロノメイガ  — Palpita inusitata (Butler, 1879)
 オオモンヒメシロノメイガ  — Palpita munroei Inoue, 1996
 マエアカスカシノメイガ  — Palpita nigropunctalis (Bremer, 1864)
 ワタヘリクロノメイガ  — Diaphania indica (Saunder, 1851)
 ミツシロモンノメイガ  — Glyphodes actorionalis Walker, 1859
 フタホシノメイガ  — Glyphodes bipunctalis Leech, 1889
 アコウノメイガ  — Glyphodes bivitralis Guenée, 1854
 アトクロオビノメイガ  — Glyphodes crithealis (Walker, 1859)
 チビスカシノメイガ  — Glyphodes duplicalis Inoue, Munroe & Mutuura, 1981
 ヒメシロマダラノメイガ  — Glyphodes fenestratus Inoue, 1996
 ツシマスカシノメイガ  — Glyphodes formosanus (Shibuya, 1928)
 オオスカシノメイガ  — Glyphodes multilinealis Kenrick, 1907
 和名未定  — Glyphodes onychinalis (Guenée, 1854)
 ツゲノメイガ  — Glyphodes perspectalis (Walker, 1859)
 スカシノメイガ  — Glyphodes pryeri Butler, 1879
 マダラシロモンノメイガ  — Glyphodes pulverulentalis Hampson, 1896
 クワノメイガ  — Glyphodes pyloalis Walker, 1859
 シロスジオオスカシノメイガ  — Glyphodes stolalis Guenée, 1854
 コブヒゲシロモンノメイガ  — Agrioglypta eurytusalis (Walker, 1859)
 イカリモンノメイガ  — Agrioglypta itysalis (Walker, 1859)
 クロマダラスカシノメイガ  — Dysallacta negatalis (Walker, 1859)
 ミドリノメイガ  — Parotis marginata (Hampson, 1893)
 オガサワラミドリノメイガ  — Parotis ogasawarensis (Shibuya, 1929)
 アオバノメイガ  — Parotis suralis (Lederer, 1863)
 シロフクロノメイガ  — Pygospila tyres (Cramer, 1780)
 ツマグロシロノメイガ  — Polythlipta liquidalis Leech, 1889
 シロモンヒゲナガノメイガ  — Nausinoe perspectata (Fabricius, 1775)
 ヒメツマグロシロノメイガ  — Leucinodes apicalis Hampson, 1896
 ナスノメイガ  — Leucinodes orbonalis Guenée, 1854
 ケブカキイロノメイガ  — Thliptoceras amamiale Munroe & Mutuura, 1968
 ミスジノメイガ  — Protonoceras capitale (Fabricius, 1794)
 オオエグリノメイガ  — Terastia subjectalis Lederer, 1863
 サツマイモノメイガ  — Omphisa anastomosalis (Guenée, 1854)
 キササゲノメイガ  — Sinomphisa plagialis (Wileman, 1911)
 ヤツボシノメイガ  — Prophantis adusta Inoue, 1986
 キバネトガリノメイガ  — Hyalobathra coenostolalis (Snellen, 1980)
 ヒメチャバネトガリノメイガ  — Hyalobathra dialychna Meyrick, 1894
 チャバネトガリノメイガ  — Hyalobathra illectalis (Walker, 1859)
 アカトガリノメイガ  — Hyalobathra undulinea (Hampson, 1891)
 キモンホソバノメイガ  — Sinibotys butleri (South, 1901)
 セスジノメイガ  — Sinibotys evenoralis (Walker, 1859)
 ヒメセスジノメイガ  — Sinibotys obliquilinealis Inoue, 1982
 キベリハネボソノメイガ  — Circobotys aurealis (Leech, 1889)
 ミナミホソバノメイガ  — Circobotys cryptica Munroe & Mutuura, 1969
 キホソノメイガ本州以南亜種  — Circobotys heterogenalis gensanalis (South, 1901)
 キホソノメイガ北海道亜種  — Circobotys heterogenalis onumalis Munroe & Mutuura, 1969
 カギバノメイガ  — Circobotys nycterina Butler, 1879
 和名未定  — Circobotys uniformis (Hampson, 1913)
 アンボイナノメイガ  — Maruca amboinalis (Felder & Rogenhofer, 1875)
 マメノメイガ  — Maruca vitrata (Fabricius, 1787)
 チャモンキイロノメイガ  — Pachynoa sabelialis (Guenée, 1854)
 ワモンノメイガ  — Nomophila noctuella ([Denis & Schiffermüller], 1775)
 アカウスグロノメイガ本土亜種  — Bradina angustalis pryeri Yamanaka, 1984
 アカウスグロノメイガ琉球亜種  — Bradina angustalis ryukyuensis Yamanaka, 1984
 シロテンウスグロノメイガ  — Bradina atopalis erectalis Yamanaka, 1984
 オオウスグロノメイガ  — Bradina erilitoides Strand, 1919
 モンウスグロノメイガ  — Bradina geminalis Caradja, 1927
 ヒメアカウスグロノメイガ  — Bradina trigonalis Yamanaka, 1984
 ハマゴウノメイガ  — Herpetogramma albipennis Inoue, 2000
 クロホシノメイガ  — Herpetogramma basale (Walker, [1866])
 ヘリグロノメイガ  — Herpetogramma cynarale (Walker, 1859)
 ウスオビクロノメイガ  — Herpetogramma fuscescens (Warren, 1892)
 クロオビクロノメイガ  — Herpetogramma licarsisale (Walker, 1859)
 モンキクロノメイガ  — Herpetogramma luctuosale zelleri (Bremer, 1864)
 キモンウスグロノメイガ  — Herpetogramma magnum (Butler, 1879)
 クロフキマダラノメイガ  — Herpetogramma moderatale (Christoph, 1881)
 キマダラクロノメイガ  — Herpetogramma ochrimaculale (South, 1901)
 ケナシチビクロノメイガ  — Herpetogramma ochrotinctale Inoue, 1982
 イノモトソウノメイガ  — Herpetogramma okamotoi Yamanaka, 1976
 ケナシクロオビクロノメイガ  — Herpetogramma phaeopterale (Guenée, 1854)
 コキモンウスグロノメイガ  — Herpetogramma pseudomagnum Yamanaka, 1976
 マエキノメイガ  — Herpetogramma rudis (Warren, 1892)
 ケナガチビクロノメイガ  — Herpetogramma stultale (Walker, 1859)
 ヘリグロキイロノメイガ  — Herpetogramma submarginale (Swinhoe, 1901)
 キオビマエキノメイガ  — Herpetogramma tominagai Yamanaka, 2003
 ヤエヤマクロノメイガ  — Herpetogramma yaeyamense Yamanaka, 2003
 ヒロバウスグロノメイガ  — Paranacoleia lophophoralis (Hampson, 1912)
 シロスジクロモンノメイガ  — Loxostege aeruginalis (Hübner, [1796])
 ウラクロモンノメイガ  — Loxostege turbidalis inornatalis (Leech, 1889)
 和名未定  — Sitochroa inornatalis (Leech, 1889)
 ウラグロシロノメイガ  — Sitochroa palealis ([Denis & Schiffermüller], 1775)
 マエキシタグロノメイガ  — Sitochroa umbrosalis (Warren, 1892)
 クロミャクノメイガ  — Sitochroa verticalis (Linnaeus, 1758)
 ヘリキスジノメイガ  — Margaritia sticticalis (Linnaeus, 1761)
 キアヤヒメノメイガ  — Diasemia accalis (Walker, 1859)
 シロアヤヒメノメイガ  — Diasemia reticularis (Linnaeus, 1761)
 チビアヤヒメノメイガ  — Diasemiopsis ramburialis (Duponchel, 1833)
 ホソトガリノメイガ  — Antigastra catalaunalis (Duponchel, 1833)
 アカヘリスカシノメイガ  — Autocharis amethystina Swinhoe, 1894
 オオモンシロルリノメイガ  — Uresiphita dissipatalis (Lederer, 1863)
 キノメイガ  — Uresiphita flavalis ([Denis & Schiffermüller], 1775)
 イタクラキノメイガ  — Uresiphita fusei Inoue, 1982
 ウラジロキノメイガ  — Uresiphita gracilis (Butler, 1879)
 モンウスベニオオノメイガ  — Uresiphita polygonalis ([Denis & Schiffermüller], 1775)
 ウスベニオオノメイガ  — Uresiphita prunipennis (Butler, 1879)
 ハネナガルリノメイガ  — Uresiphita quinquigera (Moore, 1888)
 シュモンノメイガ  — Uresiphita suffusalis (Warren, 1892)
 モンシロルリノメイガ  — Uresiphita tricolor (Butler, 1879)
 ソトウスキノメイガ  — Lipararchis tranquillalis (Lederer, 1863)
 タテシマノメイガ  — Sclerocona acutella (Eversmann, 1842)
 キムジノメイガ  — Prodasycnemis inornata (Butler, 1879)
 ミカエリソウノメイガ  — Pronomis delicatalis (South, 1901)
 ホシオビホソノメイガ  — Nomis albopedalis Motschulsky, 1861
 キタホシオビホソノメイガ  — Paranomis sidemialis Munroe & Mutuura, 1968
 イラクサノメイガ  — Eurrhypara hortulata (Linnaeus, 1758)
 ヨツメクロノメイガ  — Algedonia luctualis diversa (Butler, 1881)
 タイリクキノメイガ  — Phlyctaenia coronata (Hufnagel, 1767)
 クロマダラキノメイガ  — Phlyctaenia coronatoides (Inoue, 1960)
 クシガタノメイガ  — Phlyctaenia perlucidalis (Hübner, [1809])
 キイロノメイガ本州以南亜種  — Perinephela lancealis honshuensis Munroe & Mutuura, 1968
 キイロノメイガ北海道亜種  — Perinephela lancealis pryeri Munroe & Mutuura, 1968
 和名未定  — Perinephela obtusalis Yamanaka, 1987
 スジマガリノメイガ  — Mutuuraia terrealis (Treitschke, 1829)
 ナカミツテンノメイガ北海道亜種  — Proteurrhypara ocellalis apoialis Munroe & Mutuura, 1969
 ナカミツテンノメイガ本州以南亜種  — Proteurrhypara ocellalis ocellalis (Warren, 1892)
 ヘリジロキンノメイガ  — Paliga auratalis (Warren, 1895)
 マエベニノメイガ  — Paliga minnehaha (Pryer, 1877)
 マエウスモンキノメイガ  — Paliga ochrealis (Wileman, 1911)
 モンスカシキノメイガ  — Pseudebulea fentoni Butler, 1881
 ミヤマウスグロノメイガ  — Opsibotys perfuscalis Munroe & Mutuura, 1969
 オオフチグロノメイガ  — Paratalanta cultralis amurensis (Romanoff, 1887)
 キイロフチグロノメイガ  — Paratalanta taiwanensis sasakii Inoue, 1982
 フチグロノメイガ  — Paratalanta ussurialis (Bremer, 1864)
 和名未定  — Prionopaltis consocia Warren, 1892
 アワノメイガ  — Ostrinia furnacalis (Guenée, 1854)
 ウスジロキノメイガ  — Ostrinia latipennis (Warren, 1892)
 オナモミノメイガ  — Ostrinia orientalis orientalis Mutuura & Munroe, 1970
 マルバネキノメイガ  — Ostrinia ovalipennis Ohno, 2003
 ユウグモノメイガ  — Ostrinia palustralis memnialis (Walker, 1859)
 ウスグロキモンノメイガ  — Ostrinia quadripunctalis ([Denis & Schiffermüller], 1775)
 アカノメイガ  — Ostrinia sanguinealis sanguinealis (Warren, 1892)
 アズキノメイガ北海道亜種  — Ostrinia scapulalis pacifica Mutuura & Munroe, 1970
 アズキノメイガ本州亜種  — Ostrinia scapulalis subpacifica Mutuura & Munroe, 1970
 フキノメイガ本州亜種  — Ostrinia zaguliaevi honshuensis Mutuura & Munroe, 1970
 フキノメイガ九州亜種  — Ostrinia zaguliaevi kyushuensis Mutuura & Munroe, 1970
 フキノメイガ沖縄亜種  — Ostrinia zaguliaevi ryukyuensis Mutuura & Munroe, 1970
 ゴボウノメイガ九州・対馬・朝鮮亜種  — Ostrinia zealis bipatrialis Mutuura & Munroe, 1970
 ゴボウノメイガ本州亜種  — Ostrinia zealis centralis Mutuura & Munroe, 1970
 フチムラサキノメイガ  — Aurorobotys aurorina (Butler, 1878)
 クロシオノメイガ南硫黄島亜種  — Erpis pacificalis iwojimensis Inoue, 1996
 クロシオノメイガ小笠原亜種  — Erpis pacificalis pacificalis Hampson, 1898
 ウスグロマルモンノメイガ  — Udea exigualis (Wileman, 1911)
 ハイイロルリノメイガ  — Udea grisealis 
 ニセハイイロルリノメイガ  — Udea intermedia 
 ウスマルモンノメイガ  — Udea lugubralis (Leech, 1889)
 コマルモンノメイガ  — Udea montensis Mutuura, 1954
 ウスグロルリノメイガ  — Udea nebulatalis 
 ルリノメイガ  — Udea orbicentralis (Christoph, 1881)
 ヒメルリノメイガ  — Udea proximalis 
 ウスオビノメイガ  — Udea pseudocrocealis (South, 1901)
 チビマルモンノメイガ  — Udea stationalis Yamanaka, 1988
 チャモンノメイガ  — Udea stigmatalis (Wileman, 1911)
 クロモンキノメイガ  — Udea testacea (Butler, 1879)
 オオマルモンノメイガ  — Udea tritalis (Christoph, 1881)
 タケノメイガ  — Crypsiptya coclesalis (Walker, 1859)
 ウドノメイガ  — Udonomeiga vicinalis (South, 1901)
 ニセキンバネスジノメイガ  — Xanthopsamma aurantialis Munroe & Mutuura, 1968
 キンバネスジノメイガ  — Xanthopsamma genialis (Leech, 1889)
 スジモンカバノメイガ  — Nascia cilialis virgatalis (Christoph, 1881)
 トガリキノメイガ  — Demobotys pervulgalis pervulgalis (Hampson, 1913)
 ハッカノメイガ  — Pyrausta aurata (Scopoli, 1763)
 カクモントビノメイガ  — Pyrausta chrysitis Butler, 1881
 フタベニオビノメイガ  — Pyrausta contigualis South, 1901
 ウスオビクロチビノメイガ  — Pyrausta fuliginata Yamanaka, 1978
 トモンノメイガ  — Pyrausta limbata (Butler, 1879)
 キオビトビノメイガ  — Pyrausta mutuurai Inoue, 1982
 コチャオビノメイガ  — Pyrausta neocespitalis Inoue, 1982
 アトグロキノメイガ  — Pyrausta noctualis Yamanaka, 1978
 ベニフキノメイガ  — Pyrausta panopealis (Walker, 1859)
 マエキモンノメイガ  — Pyrausta pullatalis (Christoph, 1881)
 アカミャクノメイガ  — Pyrausta rubiginalis (Hübner, [1796])
 シロムジノメイガ  — Pyrausta testalis (Fabricius, 1794)
 ウチベニキノメイガ  — Pyrausta tithonialis Zeller, 1872
 ヒトモンノメイガ  — Pyrausta unipunctata Butler, 1881
 ハイイロムジノメイガ  — Glauconoe deductalis (Walker, 1859)
 ウンモンシロノメイガ  — Togabotys fuscolineatalis Yamanaka, 1978
 キベリスカシノメイガ  — Callibotys wilemani Munroe & Mutuura, 1969
 ウスオビキノメイガ  — Microstega jessica (Butler, 1878)
 ウスチャオビキノメイガ  — Yezobotys dissimilis (Yamanaka, 1958)
 ヘリアカキンノメイガ  — Carminibotys carminalis iwawakisana Munroe & Mutuura, 1971
 ウスヒメトガリノメイガ  — Anania albeoverbascalis Yamanaka, 1966
 クロヒメトガリノメイガ  — Anania egentalis (Christoph, 1881)
 シロモンクロノメイガ北海道亜種  — Anania funebris assimilis (Butler, 1879)
 シロモンクロノメイガ本州以南亜種  — Anania funebris astrifera (Butler, 1879)
 ヒメトガリノメイガ  — Anania verbascalis ([Denis & Schiffermüller], 1775)
 ウスジロノメイガ  — Psammotis orientalis Munroe & Mutuura, 1968
 ヒメヨツモンノメイガ  — Heliothela nigralbata Leech, 1889
 シロオビヒゲナガノメイガ  — Aetholix flavibasalis (Guenée, 1854)
 ウスグロハネボソノメイガ  — Tetridia caletoralis (Walker, 1859)
 サザナミノメイガ  — Massepha ohbai Yoshiyasu, 1990
 クロスジキノメイガ  — Acropentias aurea (Butler, 1878)
 ヤハズカズラノメイガ  — Filodes fulvidorsalis (Geyer, 1832)
 ヒロバヨツテンノメイガ  — Notarcha quaternalis (Zeller, 1852)
 ヘリジロチャバネノメイガ  — Lamprophaia albifimbrialis (Walker, [1866])
 ウスグロハラナガノメイガ(仮)  — Hymenoptychis sordida Zeller, 1852
 ヒサゴモンノメイガ  — Prooedema inscisalis (Walker, 1866)

Callidulidae
 イカリモンガ  — Pterodecta felderi (Bremer, 1864)
 ベニイカリモンガ  — Callidula attenuata (Moore, 1879)

Epicopeiidae
 アゲハモドキ本土亜種  — Epicopeia hainesii hainesii Holland, 1889
 アゲハモドキ対馬亜種  — Epicopeia hainesii tsushimana Inoue, 1978
 オナガアゲハモドキ  — Epicopeia mencia Moore, 1874
 フジキオビ  — Schistomitra funeralis Butler, 1881
 キンモンガ  — Psychostrophia melanargia Butler, 1877

Drepanidae
 ナガトガリバ  — Euparyphasma maximum (Leech, [1889])
 モントガリバ  — Thyatira batis japonica Werny, 1966
 カワムラトガリバ  — Horithyatira kawamurae (Matsumura, 1921)
 キマダラトガリバ  — Macrothyatira flavida flavida (Butler, 1885)
 ウスベニトガリバ  — Monothyatira pryeri (Butler, 1881)
 ヒメウスベニトガリバ  — Habrosyne aurorina aurorina (Butler, 1881)
 ウスベニアヤトガリバ  — Habrosyne dieckmanni roseola Matsumura, 1909
 オオアヤトガリバ  — Habrosyne fraterna japonica Werny, 1966
 タイワンアヤトガリバ  — Habrosyne indica flavescens Werny, 1966
 カラフトアヤトガリバ  — Habrosyne intermedia (Bremer, 1864)
 アヤトガリバ  — Habrosyne pyritoides derasoides (Butler, 1878)
 マエジロトガリバ  — Tethea albicostata japonibia Werny, [1967]
 オオバトガリバ  — Tethea ampliata ampliata (Butler, 1878)
 オオマエベニトガリバ  — Tethea consimilis consimilis (Warren, 1912)
 ホソトガリバ  — Tethea octogesima octogesima (Butler, 1878)
 チョウセントガリバ  — Tethea ocularis tanakai Inoue, 1982
 アカントガリバ  — Tethea or akanensis (Matsumura, 1933)
 マエベニトガリバ  — Tethea trifolium (Alphéraky, 1895)
 アマミトガリバ  — Horipsestis mushana (Matsumura, 1931)
 ヒトテントガリバ  — Tetheella fluctuosa isshikii (Matsumura, 1921)
 フタテントガリバ  — Ochropacha duplaris (Linnaeus, 1761)
 ナカジロトガリバ  — Togaria suzukiana Matsumura, 1921
 ヒメナカジロトガリバ  — Togaria tancrei (Graeser, 1888)
 ウスジロトガリバ  — Parapsestis albida Suzuki, 1916
 ギンモントガリバ  — Parapsestis argenteopicta (Oberthür, 1879)
 ニッコウトガリバ  — Epipsestis nikkoensis (Matsumura, 1921)
 ムラサキトガリバ  — Epipsestis ornata (Leech, [1889])
 ウスムラサキトガリバ  — Epipsestis perornata perornata Inoue, 1972
 ネグロトガリバ  — Mimopsestis basalis (Wileman, 1911)
 サカハチトガリバ  — Kurama mirabilis (Butler, 1879)
 タケウチトガリバ  — Betapsestis umbrosa (Wileman, 1911)
 ミスジトガリバ  — Achlya flavicornis jezoensis (Matsumura, 1927)
 キボシミスジトガリバ道南亜種  — Achlya longipennis inokoi Inoue, 1982
 キボシミスジトガリバ本州亜種  — Achlya longipennis longipennis Inoue, 1972
 キボシミスジトガリバ道東亜種  — Achlya longipennis tateyamai Inoue, 1982
 クラマトガリバ  — Sugitaniella kuramana Matsumura, 1933
 マユミトガリバ  — Neoploca arctipennis (Butler, 1878)
 ホシボシトガリバ  — Demopsestis punctigera (Butler, 1885)
 タマヌキトガリバ  — Neodaruma tamanukii Matsumura, 1933
 ナミスジトガリバ  — Mesopsestis undosa (Wileman, 1911)
 オオカギバ  — Cyclidia substigmaria nigralbata Warren, 1914
 ギンスジカギバ  — Mimozethes argentilinearia (Leech, 1897)
 マエキカギバ対馬亜種  — Agnidra scabiosa fixseni (Bryk, 1949)
 マエキカギバ本土亜種  — Agnidra scabiosa scabiosa (Butler, 1877)
 オガサワラカギバ  — Microblepsis acuminata (Leech, 1890)
 マンレイカギバ  — Microblepsis manleyi manleyi (Leech, 1898)
 ヒメハイイロカギバ  — Pseudalbara parvula (Leech, 1890)
 サキシマカギバ  — Nordstromia duplicata (Warren, 1922)
 エゾカギバ  — Nordstromia grisearia (Staudinger, 1892)
 ヤマトカギバ  — Nordstromia japonica (Moore, 1877)
 ウスオビカギバ  — Sabra harpagula olivacea (Inoue, 1958)
 オビカギバ  — Drepana curvatula acuta Butler, 1881
 ウコンカギバ  — Tridrepana crocea (Leech, [1889])
 ヒメウコンカギバ  — Tridrepana unispina Watson, 1957
 オオギンモンカギバ  — Callidrepana hirayamai hirayamai Nagano, 1918
 クロモンカギバ  — Callidrepana melanonota Inoue, 1982
 ウスイロカギバ  — Callidrepana palleola (Motschulsky, 1866)
 ギンモンカギバ  — Callidrepana patrana (Moore, 1866)
 ナミスジシロカギバ  — Ditrigona conflexaria conflexaria (Walker, 1861)
 ヨスジシロカギバ  — Ditrigona quinquelineata (Leech, 1898)
 フタテンシロカギバ  — Ditrigona virgo (Butler, 1878)
 ホシベッコウカギバ  — Deroca inconclusa phasma Butler, 1878
 マダラカギバ  — Callicilix abraxata abraxata Butler, 1885
 ヒトツメカギバ  — Auzata superba superba (Butler, 1878)
 モンウスギヌカギバ  — Macrocilix maia (Leech, [1889])
 ウスギヌカギバ  — Macrocilix mysticata watsoni Inoue, 1958
 ナカモンカギバ  — Cilix filipjevi malivora Inoue, 1958
 スカシカギバ  — Macrauzata maxima maxima Inoue, 1960
 オオフトカギバ  — Oreta fuscopurpurea Inoue, 1956
 オキナワカギバ対馬以外亜種  — Oreta loochooana loochooana Swinhoe, 1902
 オキナワカギバ対馬亜種  — Oreta loochooana timutia Watson, 1967
 アシベニカギバ  — Oreta pulchripes Butler, 1877
 クロスジカギバ  — Oreta turpis Butler, 1877
 アカウラカギバ  — Hypsomadius insignis Butler, 1877

P